On July 15, 2014, in Urgun, Afghanistan, a car bomb suicide attack took place in a crowded bazaar killing 89 people and injuring another 42. It was the bloodiest attack on civilians in Afghanistan since the 2008 Kandahar bombing.

The Attack 
At 10am police saw a suicide bomber driving a SUV into the center of Urgun, driving down the main road, the suicide bomber detonated his payload at 10:30am killing himself in the process. When he blew up the shockwave instantly destroyed 30 mainly mud and straw shops, dozens of vehicles, killing 89 people and wounding 42 more. The wounded and dead overwelled the nearby clinic and the military had to bring in helicopters and ambulances to transport casualties from the bomb site to Sharana, the Provincial capital. The Haqqani network was responsible for the attack having had planned it in the North Waziristan District of Pakistan.

See also
Taliban insurgency
2014 Yahya Khel suicide bombing (also in Paktika)

References

2014 murders in Afghanistan
Attacks in Afghanistan in 2014
Mass murder in 2014
Terrorist incidents in Afghanistan in 2014
Suicide car and truck bombings in Afghanistan
Massacres in Afghanistan
July 2014 events in Afghanistan
History of Paktika Province